Amina Jane Mohammed  (born 27 June 1961) is a Nigerian-British diplomat and politician who is serving as the fifth Deputy Secretary-General of the United Nations. Previously, she was Nigerian Minister of Environment from 2015 to 2016 and was a player in the Post-2015 Development Agenda process.

Early life and education
Amina Jane Mohammed was born in Liverpool, England, on June 27, 1961 to a Hausa-Fulani Nigerian veterinarian-officer and a British nurse. She is the eldest of five daughters.

Amina J. Mohammed attended a primary school in Kaduna and Maiduguri in Nigeria and Buchan School on the Isle of Man. She further attended Henley Management College in 1989. After she finished her studies her father demanded she return to Nigeria.

Career
Between 1981 and 1991, Amina J. Mohammed worked with Archcon Nigeria, an architectural design firm in association with Norman and Dawbarn United Kingdom. In 1991, she founded Afri-Projects Consortium, and from 1991 to 2001 she was its Executive Director. 
	
From 2002 until 2005, Amina Mohammed coordinated the Task Force on Gender and Education for the United Nations Millennium Project.
 
Amina later acted as the Senior Special Assistant to the President of Nigeria on the Millennium Development Goals (MDGs). In 2005, she was charged with the coordination of Nigeria's debt relief funds toward the achievement of the MDGs. Her mandate included designing a Virtual Poverty Fund with innovative approaches to poverty reduction, budget coordination and monitoring, as well as providing advice on pertinent issues regarding poverty, public sector reform and sustainable development. 
	 
A. Mohammed later became the Founder and CEO of the Center for Development Policy Solutions and as an Adjunct Professor for the Master's in Development Practice program at Columbia University. During that time, she served on numerous international advisory boards and panels, including the UN Secretary-General's High-level Panel on Post-2015 Development Agenda and the Independent Expert Advisory Group on the Data Revolution for Sustainable Development. She also chaired the Advisory Board of the United Nations Educational, Scientific and Cultural Organization (UNESCO) Global Monitoring Report on Education (GME).

From 2012, Amina Mohammed was a key player in the Post-2015 Development Agenda process, serving as the Special Adviser to UN Secretary-General Ban Ki-moon on Post-2015 development planning. In this role, she acted as the link between the Secretary-General, his High Level Panel of Eminent Persons (HLP), and the General Assembly’s Open Working Group (OWG), among other stakeholders. From 2014, she also served on the Secretary-General's Independent Expert Advisory Group on the Data Revolution for Sustainable Development.

Minister of the Environment (2015–2017)
Amina J. Mohammed served as Federal Minister of Environment in the cabinet of President Muhammadu Buhari from November 2015 to February 2017. During that time, she was Nigeria's representative in the African Union (AU) Reform Steering Committee, chaired by Paul Kagame. She resigned from the Nigerian Federal Executive Council on 24 February 2017.

In 2017, Amina Mohammed was accused by an advocacy group of granting illegal permits to Chinese firms to import endangered Nigerian timber during her term as Nigeria's environment minister. The Nigerian government has denied the claims.

Deputy Secretary-General of the United Nations (2017–present)

In January 2017, United Nations Secretary-General António Guterres announced his intention to appoint Mohammed Deputy Secretary-General of the United Nations. In this capacity, she is a member of the UN Interagency Coordination Group on Antimicrobial Resistance (IACG).

Other activities 
 Africa Europe Foundation (AEF), Member of the High-Level Group of Personalities on Africa-Europe Relations (since 2020)
 Global Partnership for Sustainable Development Data, member of the Board of Directors (since 2017)
 ActionAid, International Right to Education Project, member of the Advisory Board
 Bill & Melinda Gates Foundation, Member of the Global Development Program's Advisory Board
 Hewlett Foundation, member of the Board
 International Development Research Centre, member of the Board of Governors
 International Gender Champions (IGC), Member
 Institute of Scientific and Technical Information of China (ISTIC), member of the Advisory Board
 World Economic Forum's Young Global Leaders, member of the Board

Recognition 
 2006 – Order of the Federal Republic
 2007 – Nigerian Women's Hall of Fame 
 2015 – Ford Family Notre Dame Award for International Development and Solidarity
 2017 – Diplomat of the Year Awards
 2018 – Sarraounia chieftaincy title of Niger in 2018, installed by that country's Kings
 2018 – BBC 100 Women for her work as deputy secretary general of the United Nations
 2019 – Global Citizen Prize World Leader Award
 2022 – Nigerian national honour Grand Commander of the Order of the Niger

Personal life
Mohammed's daughter, Nadine Ibrahim, is a film director.

The Amina Mohammed Skills Acquisition 

The Amina Mohammed Skills Acquisition Centre which is located along the Gombe bye-pass was constructed by the SDGs in partnership with the Government of Gombe in order to honour the Deputy Secretary General of the United Nations, Hajiya Amina Mohammed's contributions to social, political and cultural boundaries. The skills acquisition centre named after her seeks to offer instrument for economic empowerment and to also cover for various life-skills trainings for young people in many areas of life.

Bibliography 
 Kabir, Hajara Muhammad,. Northern women development. [Nigeria]. . .

References

External links
 
 
 
 

1961 births
Columbia University faculty
Living people
Nigerian women company founders
Nigerian expatriate academics in the United States
Nigerian people of British descent
Nigerian women academics
Nigerian women in politics
People from Gombe State
People from Kaduna State
Deputy Secretaries-General of the United Nations
Nigerian officials of the United Nations
BBC 100 Women
Nigerian Muslims
British Muslims